is a town located in Ibaraki Prefecture, Japan. , the town had an estimated population of 24,061 in 8890 households and a population density of 516 persons per km². The percentage of the population aged over 65 was 29.1%.

Geography
Sakai is located in the flatlands in the very western portion of Ibaraki Prefecture, bordered by Chiba Prefecture to the west. The Tone River runs east to west at the southern end of the town, which is located about 50 to 60 kilometers from central Tokyo.

Neighboring municipalities
Ibaraki Prefecture
Koga, Ibaraki
Bandō, Ibaraki
Goka, Ibaraki
Chiba Prefecture
Noda, Chiba

Climate
Sakai has a Humid continental climate (Köppen Cfa) characterized by warm summers and cool winters with light snowfall.  The average annual temperature in Sakai is 14.4 °C. The average annual rainfall is 1321 mm with September as the wettest month. The temperatures are highest on average in August, at around 26.5 °C, and lowest in January, at around 3.3 °C.

Demographics
Per Japanese census data, the population of Sakai has remained relatively steady over the past 70 years.

History
In the Edo period, the village of Sakai was part of the jōkamachi of Sekiyado Domain on the opposite bank of the Tone River, and was a port for river traffic to and from Edo. The area was part of Shimōsa Province and was transferred to Ibaraki Prefecture in 1875 after the start of the Meiji period. The town of Sakai was proclaimed with the establishment of the modern municipalities system on April 1, 1889.

Government
Sakai has a mayor-council form of government with a directly elected mayor and a unicameral town council of 12 members. Sakai, together with neighboring Bandō and Goka, contributes two members to the Ibaraki Prefectural Assembly. In terms of national politics, the town is part of Ibaraki 7th district of the lower house of the Diet of Japan.

Economy
The economy of Sakai in primarily agricultural, with rice, lettuce and cabbage as the main cash corps. The town has three industrial parks.

Education
Sakai has five public elementary schools and two public middle schools operated by the town government, and one public high school operated by the Ibaraki Prefectural Board of Education.

Transportation

Railway
The town does not have any passenger railway service.

Highway
  – Sakai-Koga Interchange

Noted people from Sakai
Kishirō Nakamura, politician
Hiroshi Tomihari,  printmaker

Sister city
 Marikina, Metro Manila,  Philippines–2017

References

External links

Official Website 

Towns in Ibaraki Prefecture
Sakai, Ibaraki